Season 1996-97 saw Livingston compete in the Scottish Second Division. They also competed in the Challenge Cup, League Cup and the Scottish Cup.

Summary
In their first season in the Second Division having been promoted the previous season Livingston finished third. They reached the first round of the challenge cup, the first round of the League cup and the second round of the Scottish Cup.

Results & fixtures

Second Division

Challenge Cup

League Cup

Scottish Cup

Statistics

League table

References

Livingston
Livingston F.C. seasons